Lupus Dei (Latin for Wolf of God) is the second studio album by German power metal band Powerwolf. In addition to recording at Woodhouse Studios, Germany, the band recorded some parts of the album in the 12th-century Deutschherrenkapelle chapel in Saarbrücken. The band also used a 30-piece choir on the songs "In Blood We Trust" and "Lupus Dei".
In a May 2007 interview with Lords of Metal, Matthew Greywolf talked about the story in Lupus Dei:
Well, generally 'Lupus Dei' is focussed on parables taken out of the Bible and set in context to our passion for metal. Finally it had turned out being a real concept album with the wolf himself as the protagonist. In the Introduction to the album he loses faith in good and descends to the evil. He doesn't believe in anything but blood anymore ("In blood we trust") – but during the album he realizes the light of God step by step and finally in the title track he experiences God.

The title of the album may be a reference to the story of Thiess of Kaltenbrun, a Livonian man who lived in Jürgensburg, Swedish Livonia, in 1692 and publicly admitted being a werewolf, referring to himself as "The Hound of God", boldly claiming that he and other werewolves went to Hell to fight the Devil.

Track listing

Personnel 

Powerwolf
Attila Dorn – vocals
Matthew Greywolf – lead and rhythm guitar
Charles Greywolf – bass, rhythm guitar
Stéfane Funèbre – drums, percussion
Falk Maria Schlegel – organ, keyboards

Additional musicians
Marcel Sude – spoken words
Reverend Morschett – spoken words

Technical personnel
Fredrik Nordström – engineer, mixer
Patrik Jerksten – engineer
David Buballa – engineer, orchestra conductor
Francesco Cottone – choir conductor
Peter In de Betou – mastering
Phil Hillen – engineer

Other personnel
Manuela Meyer – photography
Matthew Greywolf – art concept, layout
Niklas Sundin – cover art

References 

2007 albums
Powerwolf albums
Concept albums
Albums produced by Fredrik Nordström